Leptocroca lenita is a moth of the family Oecophoridae. It was described by Philpott in 1931. It is found in New Zealand.

References

 Leptocroca lenita in animaldiversity

Moths described in 1931
Oecophoridae
Moths of New Zealand
Endemic fauna of New Zealand
Endemic moths of New Zealand